The Roman Catholic Diocese of Três Lagoas is a diocese located in the city of Três Lagoas in the Ecclesiastical province of Campo Grande in Brazil.

History
 January 3, 1978: Established as Diocese of Três Lagoas from the Diocese of Campo Grande

Leadership
 Bishops of Três Lagoas (Roman rite), in reverse chronological order
 Bishop Luiz Gonçalves Knupp (2015.02.25 -
 Bishop José Moreira Bastos Neto (2007.01.07 - 2014.04.26)
 Bishop Izidoro Kosinski, C.M. (1981.05.08 – 2007.01.07)
 Bishop Geraldo Majela Reis (later Archbishop) (1978.01.03 – 1981.02.03)

References
 GCatholic.org
 Catholic Hierarchy

Roman Catholic dioceses in Brazil
Christian organizations established in 1978
Tres Lagoas, Roman Catholic Diocese of
Roman Catholic dioceses and prelatures established in the 20th century